Louis Nucéra (17 July 1928 – 9 August 2000) was an award-winning 20th-century French writer.  He published his first novel L'obstiné in 1970.

Biography 

As well as being a writer, Nucéra was a cyclist (he rode the same circuit as the 1949 Tour de France), a bank clerk, a journalist, a press secretary in a record company, and a literary director at JC Lattès. He recalls his childhood in Nice in Avenue des Diables bleus.  In 1991 he wrote Le ruban rouge which chronicles the life of Italian immigrants.   In Mes ports d’attache he evokes his friendships with Cioran, Kessel, Picasso, Cocteau, Hardellet, Brassens and Moretti.

Nucéra died on August 9, 2000 in the industrial zone of Carros when he was hit by a car while bike riding.

Awards
 1981: Prix Interallié for Le Chemin de la Lanterne
 1991: Prix Jacques-Chardonne for Le ruban rouge
 1993: Grand prix de littérature de l'Académie française for the whole of his work

Works 

 1970: L'obstiné
 1971: Le greffier
 1973: Cocteau - Moretti, l'âge du verseau
 1973: Les chats « Il n'y a pas de quoi fouetter un homme »
 1974: L'Ami
 1975: Dora, dans l'enfer du camp de concentration où les savants nazis préparaient la conquête de l'espace
 1977: La Kermesse aux idoles
 1979: Avenue des Diables-Bleus 
 1980: Les Roues de la fortune
 1981: , Éditions Grasset, Prix Interallié
 1983: Entre chien et chat
 1984: Le kiosque à musique
 1987: Mes rayons de soleil
 1989: La chanson de Maria
 1990: Principauté de Monaco 
 1991: Le ruban rouge, Prix Jacques-Chardonne
 1994: Mes ports d'attache
 1997: Le roi René
 1994: Villages perchés de Provence et de la Riviera
 1998: Ils s'aimaient
 1998: Parc national du Mercantour. Montagnes du soleil, with Christine Michiels and Bertrand Bodin
 2000: Une Bouffée d'air frais
 2000: Saint-Malo, le rêve breton d'une enfance niçoise 
 2001: Les contes du lapin agile (posthumous)
 2001: , presented and foreworded by Bernard Morlino, (posthumous)
 2001: Les Chats de Paris, with Joseph Delteil, (posthumous)
 2001: Sa majesté le chat, (posthumous)
 2010:  Ils ont éclairé mon chemin, an anthology of literary critics brought together and presented by Bernard Morlino.

Further reading
1999: Nice, from Colette to Louis Nucera [fr:Nice, de Colette à Louis Nucera], Éditions du Collège Fabre, Nice, with Nicole Vaillant.
2006: La Mémoire d'un siècle (Conférences), Éditions Vaillant.

External links 
 Biographie
 Louis Nucéra on Babelio
 Louis Nucera, le copain d'alors on Libération (10 August 2000)
 Hommage to Louis Nucéra on Le petit braquet
 La fascination de Louis Nucera on INA.fr

20th-century French writers
20th-century French journalists
Cycling journalists
1928 births
People from Nice
2000 deaths
Road incident deaths in France
Prix Interallié winners